Iana "Yana" Kunitskaya (born November 11, 1989) is a Russian mixed martial artist competing in the bantamweight division in the Ultimate Fighting Championship (UFC). As of September 19, 2022, she is #6 in the UFC women's bantamweight rankings.

Biography
Yana Kunitskaya was born in 1989, in the city of Murmansk, Murmansk Oblast, in northwestern Russia. Her mother, Olga Kunitskaya, was a professional gymnast and her father, Joseph, was a professional skier. She has a younger sister, Victoria. Yana became involved in martial arts early in her childhood, starting with taekwondo at preschool age, and won numerous tournaments among both girls and boys, with many fights ending in knockouts. At 12 years old, she began competing in hand-to-hand combat, participating in a large number of fights without suffering a defeat. When she was 16 years old, Kunitskaya went to live and study in St. Petersburg, and entered the SPGUFK team at Lesgaft National State University of Physical Education, Sport and Health, Department of Boxing. At age 18, she started practicing mixed martial arts (MMA).

On August 9, 2012, Kunitskaya announced that she was pregnant with her first child. In August 2013, she announced the end of her sports career and her transition to coaching, but she came out of retirement three years later. She then signed a contract with the Invicta Fighting Championships (IFC or Invicta FC) in which only females compete.

Mixed martial arts career

Early career
Kunitskaya made her professional mixed-martial-arts debut on May 23, 2009, at a K-1 World Grand Prix event in Poland. She defeated Magdalena Jarecka by technical knockout (TKO) in the first round. After winning two of her next three fights, Kunitskaya faced unbeaten prospect Cindy Dandois at M-1 Challenge XXII on December 10, 2010. She defeated Dandois by TKO in 34 seconds. On November 19, 2011, Kunitskaya faced Arune Lauzeckaite at Bushido Hero's: World Grand Prix Lithuania, winning by TKO in the first round.

In 2012, Kunitskaya faced Ekaterina Saraykina at Verdict Fighting Championship 1 on February 11, defeating Saraykina by TKO in the first round. In March, she faced Anna Melikhova at Lion's Fights 1 and won by unanimous decision after two rounds. She then defeated Sylwia Kusiak by TKO in round one at Baltic Arena in Koszalin, Poland, in June. Kunitskaya was scheduled to face Danielle West at Starlight Events: Gladiator World Cup 2012 on July 6 in Marbella, Spain, but the event was cancelled.

Kunitskaya had fought almost exclusively in Russia, and built her record to 9 wins and 2 losses before signing to Invicta FC.

Invicta Fighting Championships
Yana defeated Tonya Evinger for the Invicta FC Bantamweight title on November 18, 2016. On December 1, the win was overturned to a no contest, so Evinger retained her title. Kunitskaya faced Evinger in a rematch in the main event of Invicta FC 22 on March 25, 2017, and lost by submission in the second round.

Kunitskaya defeated Raquel Pa'aluhi at Invicta FC 25 on August 31, 2017, to win the vacant Invicta FC Bantamweight Championship.

Ultimate Fighting Championship
Kunitskaya made her Ultimate Fighting Championship (UFC) promotional debut at UFC 222 on March 3, 2018, against Cris Cyborg for the featherweight title. She lost the fight by TKO in the first round.

Kunitskaya next faced Lina Länsberg on October 6, 2018, at UFC 229. She won the fight via unanimous decision

Kunitskaya then faced Marion Reneau on March 9, 2019, at UFC Fight Night 146. She won the fight by unanimous decision.

Kunitskaya faced Aspen Ladd on December 7, 2019, at UFC on ESPN 7. She lost the fight via technical knockout in round three.

Kunitskaya was scheduled to face Ketlen Vieira on August 1, 2020, at UFC Fight Night: Holm vs. Aldana. and on July 15, 2020, it was announced that the bout was moved to UFC Fight Night 174 on August 8, 2020.  Subsequently, Vieira was removed from the card on July 30 for undisclosed reasons and replaced by Julija Stoliarenko. She won the fight via unanimous decision.

The bout with Ketlen Vieira was rescheduled and eventually took place on February 20, 2021, at UFC Fight Night 185. At the weigh-ins, Vieira weighed in at 138 pounds, two pounds over the women's bantamweight non-title fight limit. She was fined 20% of her purse which went to Kunitskaya and the bout proceeded at catchweight. Kunitskaya won the fight via unanimous decision.

Kunitskaya faced Irene Aldana  on July 10, 2021, at UFC 264. At the weigh-ins, Aldana weighed in at 139.5 pounds, three and a half pounds over the bantamweight non-title fight limit. Her bout proceeded at catchweight and Aldana was fined 30% of her purse, which went to Kunitskaya.  Kunitskaya lost the fight via technical knockout in round one.

Kunitskaya is scheduled to face former UFC Women's Bantamweight Champion Holly Holm on March 25, 2023, at UFC on ESPN 43.

Personal life
Kunitskaya is in a relationship with former UFC athlete, Thiago Santos. She has a son from a previous relationship. The pair got engaged in December 2020. Kunitskaya announced on August 16, 2021, that the couple was expecting their first child together, leading to some fans speculating that Kunitskaya was pregnant during her fight against Irene Aldana, which had taken place just a month before, though Kunitskaya denied these claims, and female fighters in Nevada, where the fight took place, are administered pregnancy tests prior to each fight as part of the standard medical screening.

Championships and accomplishments
 Invicta Fighting Championships
 Invicta FC Bantamweight Champion (once)
 Performance of the Night (twice) vs. Tonya Evinger and Raquel Pa'aluhi
 Other
 2007 UKADO World Champion 
 2007 Russian Taekwondo Champion 
 2010 Bushido Women's MMA Champion 
 2011 Russian Muay Thai Champion

Mixed martial arts record

|-
|Loss
|align=center|14–6 (1)
|Irene Aldana
|TKO (punches)
|UFC 264 
|
|align=center|1
|align=center|4:35
|Las Vegas, Nevada, United States
|
|-
|Win
|align=center|14–5 (1)
|Ketlen Vieira
|Decision (unanimous)
|UFC Fight Night: Blaydes vs. Lewis 
|
|align=center|3
|align=center|5:00
|Las Vegas, Nevada, United States
|
|- 
|Win
|align=center|13–5 (1)
|Julija Stoliarenko
|Decision (unanimous)
|UFC Fight Night: Lewis vs. Oleinik
|
|align=center|3
|align=center|5:00
|Las Vegas, Nevada, United States
|
|-
|Loss
|align=center|12–5 (1)
|Aspen Ladd
|TKO (punches)
|UFC on ESPN: Overeem vs. Rozenstruik 
|
|align=center|3
|align=center|0:33
|Washington, D.C., United States
|   
|-
|Win
|align=center| 12–4 (1)
|Marion Reneau
| Decision (unanimous)
|UFC Fight Night: Lewis vs. dos Santos 
|
|align=center|3
|align=center|5:00
|Wichita, Kansas, United States
|
|-
| Win
| align=center| 11–4 (1)
|Lina Länsberg
| Decision (unanimous)
|UFC 229
|
|align=center|3
|align=center|5:00
|Las Vegas, Nevada, United States
|
|-
|Loss
|align=center| 10–4 (1)
|Cris Cyborg
|TKO (punches)
|UFC 222
|
|align=center| 1
|align=center| 3:25
|Las Vegas, Nevada, United States
|
|-
| Win
| align=center| 10–3 (1)
| Raquel Pa'aluhi
| Decision (unanimous)
| Invicta FC 25: Kunitskaya vs. Pa'aluhi
| 
| align=center| 5
| align=center| 5:00
| Lemoore, California, United States
| 
|-
| Loss
| align=center| 9–3 (1)
| Tonya Evinger
| Submission (rear-naked choke)
| Invicta FC 22: Evinger vs. Kunitskaya II
| 
| align=center| 2
| align=center| 4:32
| Kansas City, Missouri, United States
| 
|-
|  
| align=center| 9–2 (1)
| Tonya Evinger
| NC (overturned)
| Invicta FC 20: Evinger vs. Kunitskaya
| 
| align=center| 1
| align=center| 1:59
| Kansas City, Missouri, United States
| 
|-
| Win
| align=center| 9–2
| Wu Yanan
| TKO (punches)
| Fightspirit Championship 6
| 
| align=center|2
| align=center|0:32
| St. Petersburg, Russia
| 
|-
| Loss
| align=center| 8–2
| Zaira Dyshekova
| Submission (armbar)
| ACB 32: Battle of Lions
| 
| align=center|1
| align=center|3:38
| Moscow, Russia
| 
|-
| Win
| align=center| 8–1
| Sylwia Kusiak
| TKO (corner stoppage)
| Baltic Arena
| 
| align=center|1
| align=center|0:50
| Koszalin, Poland
|
|-
| Win
| align=center| 7–1
| Anna Melikhova
| Decision (unanimous)
| Lion's Fights 1: The Beginning
| 
| align=center|2
| align=center|5:00
| Saint Petersburg, Russia
|
|-
| Win
| align=center| 6–1
| Ekaterina Saraykina
| TKO (punches)
| Verdict Fighting Championship 1
| 
| align=center|1
| align=center|1:05
| Moscow, Russia
|
|-
| Win
| align=center| 5–1
| Arune Lauzeckaite
| TKO (punches)
| Bushido Lithuania: Hero's Lithuania 2011
| 
| align=center|1
| align=center|1:34
| Vilnius, Lithuania
|
|-
| Win
| align=center| 4–1
| Cindy Dandois
| TKO (punches)
| M-1 Challenge 22
| 
| align=center|1
| align=center|0:34
| Moscow, Russia
| 
|-
| Win
| align=center| 3–1
| Kamila Bałanda
| TKO (punches)
| Bushido Lithuania: Hero's Lithuania 2010
| 
| align=center|1
| align=center|4:26
| Vilnius, Lithuania
|
|-
| Loss
| align=center| 2–1
| Maria Hougaard Djursaa
| Decision (unanimous)
| FG 14: Ice Cold
| 
| align=center|3
| align=center|5:00
| Odense, Denmark
|
|-
| Win
| align=center| 2–0
| Vladena Yavorskaya
| Submission (rear-naked choke)
| Bushido FC Legends
| 
| align=center|1
| align=center|3:20
| Saint Petersburg, Russia
| 
|-
| Win
| align=center| 1–0
| Magdalena Jarecka
| TKO (punches)
| K-1 World Grand Prix 2009
| 
| align=center|1
| align=center|1:38
| Łódź, Poland
|
|-

References

External links
 
 

1989 births
Living people
Russian female mixed martial artists
Russian female kickboxers
Russian female taekwondo practitioners
Russian Muay Thai practitioners
Female Muay Thai practitioners
Bantamweight mixed martial artists
Featherweight mixed martial artists
Mixed martial artists utilizing ARB
Mixed martial artists utilizing taekwondo
Mixed martial artists utilizing Muay Thai
Mixed martial artists utilizing Gaidojutsu
Ultimate Fighting Championship female fighters
People from Murmansk
Sportspeople from Murmansk Oblast